Brian James (5 July 1918 – 2 November 2009) was an Australian radio, stage, television and film actor.

Early life, radio and theatre 
Brian James was born in Melbourne, the son of the Bishop of St. Arnaud and started his career as a teacher at Ivanhoe Grammar School for four years, in 1933 joining the Royal Australian Navy, after which he was demobilised five years later, and decided to pursue a career as an actor, attending Royal Central School of Speech and Drama in London, making his stage debut in 1947 and he featured in the 1952 J.C. Williamson production of Seagulls Over Sorrento. He would also appear in the 1960 TV production of the play.

According to Richard Lane "in that first decade of television it seemed that Brian James was everywhere."

He also appeared in ABC radio plays.

Television 

James appeared in several ABC drama plays in the late 1950s, including Duke In Darkness and Killer in Close-Up: The Wallace Case in 1957, Gaslight, The Small Victory, The Public Prosecutor, and The Governess (all 1958), Crime Passionel, Treason, and The House By The Stable (1959). He had the lead role as Dr Geoffrey Thompson in the early medical drama Emergency (1959). He also appeared in commercial dramas Shadow of a Pale Horse and Seagulls Over Sorrento in 1960, along with ABC dramas Heart Attack, Eye of the Night, and Mine Own Executioner, and was awarded the TV Week Logie award for "Best Actor" for the plum role of Governor William Bligh in the 1960 ABC drama serial Stormy Petrel (a role which he reprised in a 1974 episode of the anthology series Behind The Legend).

Other ABC drama play appearances included The Ides Of March (1961), The Physicists, Luther, and The Wind From The Icy Country (all 1964).

In 1962, he took the lead role of Jonah Locke in the ATN-7 drama series Jonah.

In 1964, James appeared as a presenter on This Is It!, the opening night program for ATV-0 in Melbourne.

He also featured as Ian Bennett in Bellbird. He appeared as George Tippett in the soap opera Skyways (1979–81) – a character he continued in the ill-fated series Holiday Island in 1981.

He is probably best known to international audiences for his part in the cult soap opera Prisoner (aka Prisoner: Cell Block H) as friendly officer and later prison handyman Stan Dobson, having previously appeared in the series briefly as Dr. Kennedy. He also appeared as John Worthington in Neighbours in the late 1980s.

Film 
On film, he made an uncredited appearance as a naval officer in the 1959 Stanley Kramer film On the Beach. He also played screen father to Meryl Streep in A Cry in the Dark, the 1988 movie about the Lindy Chamberlain court case.

Personal life and death 
Brian James had served with the Royal Australian Navy during World War II. He died at The Alfred Hospital, Melbourne, of complications following a fall in 2009 aged 91.

Selected filmography

Select TV credits
Wind from the Icy Country (1964)

References

External links
 

1918 births
2009 deaths
Australian male film actors
Australian male television actors
Logie Award winners